Darreh Maran (also Romanized as Darreh Marān and Darreh-ye Marrān) is a village in Sahneh Rural District, in the Central District of Sahneh County, Kermanshah Province, Iran. At the 2006 census, its population was 39, in 9 families.

References 

Populated places in Sahneh County